The Ultimate Adventure is an album recorded by Chick Corea and released in 2006.

Like his 2004 album To the Stars, The Ultimate Adventure is a musical tribute to the work of science fiction author and Scientology founder L. Ron Hubbard. The album draws heavily upon the rhythmic and melodic traditions of African, Spanish, and Arabian music.

The Ultimate Adventure peaked number 7 in the Billboard Top Jazz albums and also won two Grammy awards in 2007 for Best Jazz Instrumental Performance (Individual or Group) and Best Instrumental Arrangement.

Track listing 
"Three Ghouls, Pt. 1" – 1:38
"Three Ghouls, Pt. 2" – 4:02
"Three Ghouls, Pt. 3" – 3:11
"City of Brass" – 6:38
"Queen Tedmur" – 5:15
"El Stephen, Pt. 1" – 6:39
"El Stephen, Pt. 2" – 1:47
"King & Queen" – 6:06
"Moseb the Executioner, Pt. 1" – 1:39
"Moseb the Executioner, Pt. 2" – 2:20
"Moseb the Executioner, Pt. 3" – 1:54
"North Africa" – 6:24
"Flight from Karoof, Pt. 1" – 6:11
"Flight from Karoof, Pt. 2" – 1:36
"Planes of Existence, Pt. 1" – 5:25
"Arabian Nights, Pt. 1" – 4:30
"Arabian Nights, Pt. 2" – 2:38
"Gods & Devils" – 2:15
"Planes of Existence, Pt. 2" – 2:50

Personnel
Musicians
 Chick Corea – acoustic piano, Fender Rhodes electric piano, acoustic and electronic percussion, synthesizers
 Hubert Laws – flute (on "Three Ghouls", "Queen Tedmur")
 Jorge Pardo – flute, saxophone, palmas handclaps ("City of Brass", "El Stephen", "King & Queen", "North Africa", "Flight from Karoof", "Planes of Existence", "Gods & Devils")
 Tim Garland – bass clarinet (on "Queen Tedmur"), tenor saxophone (on "Moseb the Executioner")
 Frank Gambale – acoustic guitar (on "Arabian Nights")
 Carles Benavent – electric bass, palmas handclaps
 Steve Gadd – drums, palmas handclaps (on "Three Ghouls", "El Stephen", "Flight from Karoof")
 Vinnie Colaiuta – drums (on "Queen Tedmur", "Moseb the Executioner", "North Africa", "Arabian Nights")
 Tom Brechtlein – drums, palmas handclaps (on "King & Queen", "Planes of Existence")
 Airto Moreira – percussion (on "Three Ghouls", "Moseb the Executioner", "North Africa"), vocals
 Hossam Ramzy – percussion (on "City of Brass", "Flight from Karoof")
 Rubem Dantas  – percussion, palmas handclaps (on "King & Queen", "Moseb the Executioner", "North Africa", "Planes of Existence", "Arabian Nights", "Gods & Devils")

Production personnel
 Bernie Kirsh – recording engineer
 Al Schmitt – mixing engineer
 Buck Snow – mixing engineer
 Doug Sax – mastering engineer

Chart performance

References

External links 
 Chick Corea – The Ultimate Adventure (2006) album review by Thom Jurek, credits & releases at AllMusic
 Chick Corea – The Ultimate Adventure (2006) album releases & credits at Discogs
 Chick Corea – The Ultimate Adventure (2006) album to be listened as stream on Spotify

Chick Corea albums
Jazz fusion albums by American artists
2006 albums
Stretch Records albums
Grammy Award for Best Jazz Instrumental Album
L. Ron Hubbard